Ettson Ayón Calderón (born 26 March 2001) is a Mexican professional footballer who plays as a forward for Liga MX club Querétaro, on loan from Tijuana.

Career statistics

Club

References

External links
 
 
 

Living people
2001 births
Mexican footballers
Mexico youth international footballers
Association football forwards
Club Tijuana footballers
Liga MX players
Querétaro F.C. footballers
Footballers from Baja California
Sportspeople from Tijuana